Colonel Sir Charles Rosdew Forbes-Leith, 1st Baronet (20 February 1859 – 2 November 1930), known as Charles Burn until 1923 and as Sir Charles Burn, Bt, between 1923 and 1925, was a British army officer and Conservative Party politician who was Member of Parliament for Torquay from 1910 to 1923.

Biography
Burn served in the 8th Hussars and the 1st Dragoons, before he was transferred to the 3rd (Militia) Battalion of the Gordon Highlanders in 1899. He was seconded for service with the Imperial Yeomanry in South Africa on 31 January 1900, after the outbreak of the Second Boer War, and was in command of a Battalion. He later commanded the Westminster Dragoons.

Burn was elected to Parliament at the December 1910 general election and held his seat until it was won by the Liberal Party in 1923. As well as his work with the Conservative Party Burn also joined the British Fascisti upon its formation in 1923 and sat on the Grand Council of what was initially a group with close ties to the right of the Conservative Party. He was also a member of the National Citizens Union, a rightist pressure group.

Burn was Aide-de-camp to King George V from 1910 to 1926 and was created a baronet, of Jessfield near Edinburgh in the County of Midlothian, in 1923. Burn was married to the Honourable Ethel Louise Forbes-Leith, daughter of Alexander Forbes-Leith, 1st Baron Leith of Fyvie. When Lord Leith died in 1925 without male heir, thus resulting in the extinction of the title, Burn changed his name by deed poll to Charles Forbes-Leith of Fyvie and was able to inherit the family seat of Fyvie Castle.

References

1859 births
1930 deaths
Graduates of the Royal Military College, Sandhurst
8th King's Royal Irish Hussars officers
1st The Royal Dragoons officers
Gordon Highlanders officers
Westminster Dragoons officers
Conservative Party (UK) MPs for English constituencies
Baronets in the Baronetage of the United Kingdom
UK MPs 1910–1918
UK MPs 1918–1922
UK MPs 1922–1923
British fascists
Liberal Unionist Party MPs for English constituencies